Taurisano is a town and comune in the province of Lecce, in the Apulia region of south-east Italy. It is located in the Salento area.  Nearby towns are Acquarica del Capo, Casarano, Ruffano and Ugento.

The town of Taurisano is the place of birth of the philosopher  Giulio Cesare Vanini.

Main sights

 
Church of Santa Maria di Strada, in Apulian-Romanesque style (mid-13th/early 14th centuries). The façade has a portal sided by two plinths, which support two crouching animals (a bull and a lion); the architrave has a bas-relief depicting the Annunciation. At the side, under the bell-gable, is a Byzantine sundial with the time written both in Latin and Greek characters.
Church of Santo Stefano Protomartire (15th century, but later rebuilt in 1796).
Church of San Nicola della Consolata (1733), annexed to the Ducal Palace. The latter was completed in 1770 above an Angevine 13th-century castle, and has a 16th-century tower with Guelph merlons.
Remains of the Byzantine Chapel of San Donato (7th-8th centuries)
Megalith of Specchia Silva and Sanjetti Menhir

References

Cities and towns in Apulia
Localities of Salento